George Preston Coleman (May 4, 1870 – June 16, 1948) was the head of the Virginia Highway Commission from 1913 to 1922  and the mayor of Williamsburg, Va., from 1929 to 1934. The George P. Coleman Memorial Bridge that connects Yorktown and Gloucester Point is named after him. He is the grandson of Nathaniel Beverley Tucker and the great-grandson of St. George Tucker. The papers of the Tucker-Coleman family, including the papers of George Preston Coleman, are held by the Special Collections Research Center at the College of William & Mary.

References

External links
 

1870 births
1948 deaths
Mayors of Williamsburg, Virginia
George Coleman